The PAEF slender skink (Brachymeles paeforum) is a species of skink endemic to the Philippines.

References

Reptiles of the Philippines
Reptiles described in 2011
Brachymeles